Kathy Jordan and Elizabeth Smylie defeated Mercedes Paz and Arantxa Sánchez Vicario in the final, 7–6(7–4), 6–4 to win the doubles tennis title at the 1990 Virginia Slims Championships.

Martina Navratilova and Pam Shriver were the four-time defending champions, but withdrew due to a knee surgery to Navratilova.

Seeds

Draw

Draw

External links
 Official results archive (ITF)
 Official results archive (WTA)

References

Doubles
1990 WTA Tour